Stanisławowo may refer to the following places:
Stanisławowo, Legionowo County in Masovian Voivodeship (east-central Poland)
Stanisławowo, Białystok County in Podlaskie Voivodeship (north-east Poland)
Stanisławowo, Łomża County in Podlaskie Voivodeship (north-east Poland)
Stanisławowo, Nowy Dwór Mazowiecki County in Masovian Voivodeship (east-central Poland)
Stanisławowo, Płock County in Masovian Voivodeship (east-central Poland)
Stanisławowo, Żuromin County in Masovian Voivodeship (east-central Poland)
Stanisławowo, Konin County in Greater Poland Voivodeship (west-central Poland)
Stanisławowo, Września County in Greater Poland Voivodeship (west-central Poland)
Stanisławowo, Pomeranian Voivodeship (north Poland)

See also
Stanisławów (disambiguation)